Håkan Isacson (1943–2002) was a Swedish intelligence agent who became known as the whistleblower of the IB affair, a political scandal in Sweden in the 1970s. Isacson was a former employee at IB, a secret Swedish domestic intelligence organization, who was used as the source by journalists Peter Bratt and Jan Guillou when they made the existence of the organization public in May 1973. On 4 January 1974 Isacson, along with Bratt and Guillou, was convicted of espionage by the Stockholm District Court and sentenced to 12 months in prison.

Isacson was a closeted homosexual.

References

People from Medelpad
Swedish spies
Swedish criminals
Swedish whistleblowers
Swedish gay men
People convicted of spying
1958 births
2002 deaths
20th-century Swedish LGBT people